Condução coercitiva is a Brazilian judicial mandate or summons, which provides for a compulsory method of bringing subjects of a judicial process, victims, witnesses, accused parties, or expert subjects into the presence of law enforcement or judicial authorities against their wishes. This is a measure provided for in the Penal Code of Brazil (CPP) as a means of compelling the appearance of a person to attend an action to which he was summoned, but who failed to do so without justification.

According to some jurists, this is a form of short-term "precautionary detention" whose purpose is to ensure the convenience of the production of proof.
If equated with precautionary detention,  is contrary to the Brazilian Constitution of 1988 Article 5, paragraph LXI, even though the procedure is in the Penal Code of Brazil, instituted in 1941.

Article 218 of the CPP refers to the requirement of prior summons. Thus, some argue that even with the justification of providing clarification to the police investigation and even in the interests of justice, the  warrant without a summons violates the right to liberty of witnesses and defendants.

There is some controversy concerning the exact legal foundation and even constitutionality of the  warrant. From a legal perspective, it is not the same as an arrest warrant.

See also 

 Federal Police of Brazil
 Material Witness
 Operation Car Wash
 Public Prosecutor's Office (Brazil)

References 
Notes

Citations

External links 

 Constituição Da República Federativa Do Brasil De 1988 
 Constitution of the Federative Republic of Brazil  pdf; 432 pages
 Official Senate legislation search engine for Brazilian law 
 Unofficial translations of Brazilian law into English

Law enforcement in Brazil